Taperoá is a municipality in the state of Paraíba in the Nordeste of Brazil.  It was founded in 1886. As of 2020 the municipality population is 15,441.

See also
List of municipalities in Paraíba

References

Municipalities in Paraíba
Populated places established in 1886